Samuel Orr (July 11, 1890 – August 29, 1981) was a socialist politician from New York City best remembered for being one of the five elected members of the Socialist Party of America expelled by the New York State Assembly during the First Red Scare in 1920.

Biography

Early years
Orr was born on July 11, 1890, in the town of Rajgród, then a part of Russian-occupied Poland.  His family moved to the United States in 1891.  Orr graduated from the New York University School of Law and practiced law, including time at the firm of Benjamin N. Cardozo and Nathan Bijur.

Political career
In November 1917, Orr was elected on the Socialist ticket to the New York State Assembly (Bronx Co., 4th D.), and sat in the 141st New York State Legislature, being one of 10 members of the Socialist Party which were elected to the Assembly of 1918, the high-water mark of the party's fortunes in the state.

In November 1919, Orr was re-elected to the Assembly, but on the first day of the session of the 143rd New York State Legislature he was called before the Speaker along with four of his Socialist colleagues — Louis Waldman, Charles Solomon, Samuel A. DeWitt, and August Claessens. The five were charged with being unfit for membership in the Assembly through their membership in the Socialist Party and were suspended from their seats by a vote of 140 to 6.

A protracted political trial before the Assembly Committee on the Judiciary followed to determine the fitness of the five Socialists to take their seats, which ran throughout the winter and spring. The so-called "trial" began on January 20, 1920. Morris Hillquit and Seymour Stedman were the lead attorneys in handling the case for the Socialist defendants. The group was formally expelled on April 1, 1920. All five were re-elected at a special election on September 16, and appeared to take their seats at the beginning of the special session on September 20. The next day, Orr and DeWitt were permitted to take their seats, but Claessens, Solomon and Waldman were expelled again. Protesting against the re-expulsion of their comrades, DeWitt and Orr resigned their seats.

Samuel Orr was re-elected to the State Assembly in November 1920, and took his seat in the 144th New York State Legislature for the session of 1921.

In 1922, Orr ran in the 22nd District for the New York State Senate, but lost. He ran again in 1928 in the same district, without success. In 1933, Orr ran in the 21st District, and lost once again.

Orr ran for US Congress in the 23rd District of New York in 1926, and again in 1930 and 1934. He lost each time.

He was appointed a New York City Special Deputy Controller in 1938.  He was appointed a city magistrate by Mayor Fiorello H. La Guardia in 1941 and served for 10 years.

Death and legacy
Samuel Orr died at Montefiore Hospital in the Bronx on August 29, 1981.

See also
List of New York Legislature members expelled or censured

Footnotes

Further reading
 New York State Legislature, Standing Committee on the Judiciary, Louis M. Martin, Louis Waldman, Samuel Aaron De Witt, August Claessens, Samuel Orr, Charles Solomon, Proceedings of the Judiciary Committee of the Assembly: In The Matter Of The Investigation By The Assembly Of The State Of New York As To The Qualifications Of Louis Waldman, August Claessens, Samuel A DeWitt, Samuel Orr, And Charles Solomon To Retain Their Seats In Said Body. In Three Volumes. New York: J.B. Lyon Co., 1920. Available online: Volume I, Volume II, Volume III.
 Louis Waldman, Albany: The Crisis in Government: The History of the Suspension, Trial and Expulsion from the New York State Legislature in 1920 of the Five Socialist Assemblymen by Their Political Opponents. Introduction by Seymour Stedman. New York: Boni and Liveright, 1920.

External links

 

1890 births
1981 deaths
American activists
American trade union leaders
American Marxists
Emigrants from the Russian Empire to the United States
New York University School of Law alumni
New York (state) lawyers
Socialist Party of America politicians from New York (state)
Expelled members of the New York State Assembly
20th-century American politicians
Politicians from the Bronx